Patti Lyle Collins was a writer and an American civil servant who worked in the Dead Letter Office of the Post Office Department. Nicknamed the "Blind Reader", Collins was known for her ability to determine the destination of letters with hard to read or incomplete addresses.

Collins was born in Alabama to William Durham and Mary (née Bibb) Lyles. The only child of a wealthy family, her early interest in languages were supported through education and travel. She married N. D. Collins, a lawyer from Memphis, Tennessee in 1866. Following the death of her husband and father, Collins was left to support three children and her mother. Before landing a job at the Post Office Department she taught and published writing.

As an employee of the Post Office Department she was promoted several times, first to assistant translator and, later, to a position as head of the Dead Letter Office. Her ability to read multiple languages informed an extensive knowledge of historical and geographical references, which she used to help direct letters with incomplete, illegible or illogical addresses. Over time, Collins developed an in-depth knowledge of streets in cities and towns throughout the country. It allowed her to correctly direct a letter with "Island" as the address to Wheeling, West Virginia that locals called "The Island". In another instance, she knew that a letter with "Giuvani Cirelili, Presidente Sterite, Catimoa" on the envelope was intended for to Baltimore, Maryland, which was the only American city at the time to have a President Street.

Collins died in Washington, D.C., on December 23, 1913. She was buried at the Rock Creek Cemetery.

Publications

References

United States Postal Service people
1913 deaths